Gib Hill is a large burial mound in the Peak District, Derbyshire, England. It is thought to be a Neolithic oval barrow with an Early Bronze Age round barrow superimposed at one end. It is located some 300 metres south-west of Arbor Low henge.

Excavations
Three exploratory excavations were conducted in the 19th century: the first by the owner, Mr Thornhill in 1812, a second by William Bateman and S. Mitchell in 1824, and a third by Thomas Bateman in 1848. The 1848 excavations uncovered a cist of early Bronze Age date, containing a cremation and food vessel. The complex structure of the barrow suggests that it consists of a Neolithic oval barrow with an Early Bronze Age round barrow superimposed at one end. This configuration can be seen clearly by looking up at the barrow from the north.

Siting
Gib Hill is part of a complex of prehistoric monuments with Arbor Low. The Neolithic barrow at Gib Hill was probably the first element in the complex.

Notes

External links
Visitor information (English Heritage)

Archaeological sites in Derbyshire
English Heritage sites in Derbyshire
Barrows in the United Kingdom